Salai Sun Ceu (also spelt Salai Kye Oh; 13 January 1952 – 7 April 2004) was a popular Chinland and Myanmar pop singer and songwriter. He died in 2004 from cardiac arrest.

Discography
 Studio albums
 1975 (Kyi Nat Ba Dawh) ကြေနပ်ပါတော့
 1976 (Sig tha ya a luan) စိတ္တရအလွမ်း
 1976 (Pa da ta lan, than ta lan) ပြဓါးတစ်လမ်း သံတစ်လမ်း
 1978 (Htin khuk tha ma) ထင်း ခုပ်သမား
 1994: (Sung phiat laih bah, sung phiat laih byi) ဆုံးဖြတ်လိုက်ပါ။ ဆုံးဖြတ်လိုက်ပြီ။

References

 
 

1952 births
2004 deaths
20th-century Burmese male singers
Male singer-songwriters